Joan Miller Lipsky (April 9, 1919 – August 18, 2015) was an American attorney and politician who served as a member of the Iowa House of Representatives from 1967 to 1979.

Early life and education 
Lipsky was born in Cedar Rapids, Iowa. After graduating from the Gulf Park Academy for Women in Mississippi, she earned a Bachelor of Science degree in psychology from Northwestern University.

Career 
Lipsky attended graduate school at Iowa State University. She was a staff psychologist at the University of Chicago Medical Center and later worked as a private practice consulting psychologist.

She served in the Iowa House of Representatives from 1967 to 1979 as a Republican. During her final term in the House, Lipsky began attending the University of Iowa College of Law. She earned her Juris Doctor in 1980 and began practicing law in Cedar Rapids. Lipsky was a Republican candidate for lieutenant governor during the 1986 Iowa gubernatorial election.

Personal life 
She was married to Abbott Bennett Lipsky until his death in 2008. They had three children, including John Lipsky, and economist who served as the acting managing director of the International Monetary Fund. During her retirement, Lipsky split her time between Cedar Rapids and Sarasota, Florida. She died in 2015.

References

1919 births
2015 deaths
People from Cedar Rapids, Iowa
Women state legislators in Iowa
Republican Party members of the Iowa House of Representatives
Northwestern University alumni
Iowa State University alumni
University of Chicago staff
21st-century American women